Theodor Andreas Käärik (10 November 1889 Viljandi – 3 February 1940 Tallinn) was an Estonian politician. He was a member of Estonian Constituent Assembly, representing the Estonian Labour Party. He was a member of the assembly since 17 October 1919. He replaced August Arras.

References

1889 births
1940 deaths
People from Viljandi
People from Kreis Fellin
Estonian Labour Party politicians
Members of the Estonian Constituent Assembly
Imperial Russian Army officers
Russian military personnel of World War I
Recipients of the Order of St. Anna, 4th class
Recipients of the Order of Saint Stanislaus (Russian), 3rd class
Recipients of the Order of St. Vladimir, 4th class
Recipients of the Order of the White Star, 2nd Class